Araluen is a residential locality in Gympie in the Gympie Region, Queensland, Australia.

Geography

The Bruce Highway forms part of the western boundary of the suburb. The North Coast railway line enters the suburb from the south (Gympie) and exits to the north-east (Banks Pocket / Veteran).

The land use is residential with the exception of the Gympie Regional Council Saleyards in Saleyard Road in the south-east of the locality. It is served by the Banks Pocket railway siding on the North Coast line.

History
Gympie Christian Academy opened in 1980 on the site of the former Gympie cattle yards. Initially, there were two teachers, two teacher aides, and 36 students with one classroom also being used as a church. In 1999, the school was renamed Victory College. The equestrian centre was built in 2015 with the roof added over the arena in 2018.

Economy 
Gympie Regional Council Saleyards conducts sales every fortnight with 60,000 cattle passing through the sale years each year.

Education 
Victory College is a private primary and secondary (K-12) school at 173 Old Maryborough Road. It has an equestrian centre and a full-sized undercover arena (the only one at a school in Queensland). In 2018, the school had an enrolment of 582 students with 44 teachers (43 full-time equivalent) and 40 non-teaching staff (34 full-time equivalent). In 2021, the school had an enrolment of 752 students with 57 teachers (54 full-time equivalent) and 58 non-teaching staff (47.2 full-time equivalent).

Amenities 
The Apolostic Church of Queensland is at 432 Old Maryborough Road (northern corner with Atlkinsons Road).

References

Suburbs of Gympie
Localities in Queensland